William Fernandez was a Luso-African in the Pongo River area of Guinea in the early nineteenth century.

In the 1750s William Settel Fernandes married the daughter of a Baga leader.

In 1885, at Rio Nunez, Dr. Bayol, the future governor of Rivières du Sud, met William Fernandez king of the Bramaya.

References

Guinean people of Portuguese descent
Guinean people